Robert Christopher Bell (born November 23, 1959) is an American politician, attorney, and former journalist. He is a graduate of the University of Texas at Austin and South Texas College of Law. Bell served five years on the Houston City Council from 1997 to 2001, followed by one term in the United States House of Representatives from Texas's 25th Congressional District in Houston from 2003 to 2005.

Bell then became the Democratic nominee in the 2006 election for the office of Governor of Texas, losing to Republican incumbent Governor Rick Perry by 406,450 votes (Perry 39% versus Bell 30%) in a fractured general election campaign that also drew in two significant independent challengers. Bell, a member of the Democratic Party, is currently an attorney specializing in personal injury and commercial litigation. Prior to practicing law, Bell had been a prominent radio journalist in Texas.

Personal history
Chris Bell was born in Abilene, the seat of Taylor County in West Texas. He was reared in Dallas and moved to Austin when he was accepted to the University of Texas at Austin. As a student, Bell was a member of Phi Delta Theta, and served as president of the Interfraternity Council, and also spearheaded a successful effort to reinstate student government. In 1982, he graduated with a journalism degree and began work as a television and radio journalist, first in Ardmore, Oklahoma and later in Amarillo. He then moved to Houston, working as a Harris County court radio reporter while taking night classes at South Texas College of Law.

Despite his success in journalism (he was named “best radio reporter in the state” in 1990 by the Texas Associated Press), he left journalism and began what would become a successful litigation practice after receiving his J.D. degree and being licensed as an attorney in Texas in 1992. Bell's public service career began in 1997, after being elected to the Houston City Council. After his campaign for State Senate in 2008, Bell returned to the private practice of law.

He currently lives in the Heights area of Houston.

Political career

Texas House of Representatives campaign (1984)

In 1984, Bell ran for Amarillo-based District 87 for the Texas House of Representatives after friends assured him they could get him a job as a legal assistant if he won. Bell was defeated by a large margin by incumbent Charles J. "Chip" Staniswalis.

Houston City Council (1997–2002)
Bell ran for Houston City Council in 1995. He received third place, behind David Ballard and eventual winner Orlando Sanchez.

He ran again in a 1997 special election, called to fill the seat vacated by the resignation of John Peavy. He placed second in the election after African American minister James W.E. Dixon II. However, since no candidate won more than 50 percent of the vote, the election went to a runoff. Bell defeated Dixon by 6,000 votes.

Bell served as at large Position 4 councilman for the Houston City Council for five years. During this time, he served as chairman of both the Council Committee on Customer Service and Initiatives and the Ethics Committee. Throughout his service, he focused on ethics reform, passing laws that limited the use of soft money in city elections. He also championed what he called “customer-driven government,” featuring innovative ideas to make government more accessible to the public. He also helped pass the largest tax cut in the city's history and worked to pass sweeping ethics reform that significantly cleaned up what was a corrupt local government.

Mayoral campaign (2001)
In 2001, Bell ran against incumbent mayor Lee P. Brown. Brown and Bell's first disagreement was previously in 2000, when Bell joined with conservatives to pass a 2-cent property tax rollback, causing Brown to replace Bell as chairman. Bell finished third behind Brown and Republican candidate Orlando Sanchez. Bell and Mayor Brown reconciled after the election — Bell endorsed Brown during the resulting runoff election and Brown was a vocal supporter for Bell's 2002 congressional bid.

U.S. Congress (2003–2005)

In 2002, Bell successfully ran for the United States House of Representatives for Texas District 25. He represented most of southwestern Houston, including most of the city's share of Fort Bend County. He was made assistant whip by House Democratic whip Steny Hoyer of Maryland. Bell also served on four standing committees, and was responsible for founding the Port Security Caucus, a group dedicated to improving seaport security.

In October 2003, Bell became a target in U.S. House Majority Leader Tom DeLay’s 2003 congressional redistricting effort. One proposal would have thrown Bell into the heavily Republican 7th District of John Culberson. The final plan was somewhat less ambitious, but still put Bell in political jeopardy. His 25th District was renumbered as the 9th District, and absorbed a larger number of blacks and Latinos than he had previously represented. The old 25th was approximately 65 percent white; the new 9th was only 17 percent white. On March 9, 2004, Bell was handily defeated in the Democratic primary for District 9 by Al Green, the former president of the Houston NAACP, with Bell receiving only 31 percent of the vote.

Three months after losing his primary election, on June 15, 2004, Bell filed an ethics complaint against DeLay, alleging abuse of power and illegal solicitation of money, among other things. Bell's charges ended a seven-year "truce" on such official accusations between the parties. Four months later, the House Ethics Committee unanimously "admonished" DeLay – a disciplinary measure less harsh than (in increasing order of severity) a fine, reprimand, censure, or expulsion – on two of Bell's charges.

In response to Bell's first complaint, it was found that "(1) neither Representative DeLay nor anyone acting on his behalf improperly solicited contributions from [the energy company] Westar, and (2) Representative DeLay took no action with regard to Westar that would constitute an impermissible special favor"; but that DeLay's involvement in a Westar fundraiser was "objectionable" in that it raised "an appearance of impropriety under House standards."

Bell's second complaint was "resolved by a letter of admonition" indicating that "the contacts of Representative DeLay’s staff with the Federal Aviation Administration" (regarding absentee Texas legislators) raised "serious concerns ... under House standards of conduct that preclude using governmental resources for a political undertaking."

The committee ultimately concluded that, for these two of Bell's three complaints, "formal investigation" was "not warranted." Bell's third complaint, alleging "violation of provisions of the Texas election code," was deferred by the committee for investigation by authorities in the state of Texas.

In 2005, after two unsuccessful attempts,  Democratic District Attorney Ronnie Earle obtained an indictment from a Travis County grand jury against DeLay on criminal charges that he had violated state campaign-finance laws. The indictments effectively ended DeLay's political career; he resigned from office the following year. Tried by an Austin jury, DeLay was convicted in November 2010 on two charges of conspiracy and money laundering. On September 19, 2013, the Texas Court of Appeals for the Third District overturned both convictions and entered an acquittal for DeLay. Subsequently, the Texas Court of Criminal Appeals, the state's highest criminal court, affirmed the district court's reversal of the jury verdict in an 8–1 ruling, concluding that "what prosecutors proved in DeLay's case did not constitute either offense." DeLay termed his decade-long legal ordeal, originally instigated by Bell's complaints, "an outrageous criminalization of politics," and indicated that said he would "probably not" seek any return to elected office.

Gubernatorial campaign (2006)

Bell was the Democratic candidate in the 2006 election for the office of Governor of Texas. He ran against Republican incumbent Rick Perry and independents Carole Strayhorn and Kinky Friedman. Bell ultimately received 1,310,353 votes, or 29.79%, in the four-way race. Following the loss, Chris Bell and the political action committee (PAC) "Clean Government Advocates for Chris Bell" sued Gov. Perry and the Republican Governors Association, claiming they illegally hid $1 million in donations from Houston homebuilder Bob Perry (no relation to the governor) in the final days of the 2006 gubernatorial campaign.

Rick Perry chose to settle his part of the lawsuit out of court, but the Republican Governors Association did not. An initial court ruling in 2010 (by Travis County judge John Dietz) favored Bell, but that verdict was subsequently reversed on appeal in 2013, and the appellate court panel sent the case back to District Court to determine how much Bell should reimburse the governors association for associated legal fees.

State Senate District 17 campaign (2008)
On July 18, 2008, Bell announced on his campaign website that he would run in the special election for Texas Senate, District 17. The election was made necessary by the resignation of  Republican Senator Kyle Janek. While Bell emerged with a plurality in the November 4, 2008 election, he did not garner enough votes to avoid a special election runoff with Republican Joan Huffman, a former judge and prosecutor.
Despite heavy support from Democratic volunteers and officials, he ultimately lost the runoff to Huffman on December 16 with 43.7 percent of the vote to Huffman's 56.3 percent.

Mayoral campaign (2015)

Bell ran for Houston Mayor in 2015 but finished fifth during the general elections. Bell then endorsed Bill King, raising eyebrows. Bell had received only 7 percent of the general vote, concentrated in the district C precincts. It was not dispersed throughout the entire city.

Senate campaign (2020) 

Bell ran for Senate in Texas in the 2020 election. He lost the March 2020 Democratic primary, coming in sixth place with 8.5% of the vote and failing to advance to the runoff. Bell finished behind former congressional candidate M.J. Hegar, State Senator Royce West, labor organizer Cristina Tzintzún Ramirez, businesswoman Annie "Mamá" Garcia, and Houston City Councilor Amanda Edwards.

Issues and positions

Abortion
Bell voted no on banning partial birth abortion except to save the mother's life and had a 100 percent rating from NARAL Pro-Choice America.

Immigration
Bell supports the use of United States National Guard troops along the U.S.-Mexico border, "as long as we are very careful not to turn the border into a militarized zone." He also supports the McCain-Kennedy bill that would provide a so-called "pathway" to citizenship for millions of illegal immigrants already in the country, provided they had jobs, learned English, paid fines and met certain other requirements. "I don't want to see anybody cutting in line, but I do think that people should be able to earn their citizenship if they're productive and law-abiding citizens."

Education
Bell supports increased spending for the Texas public education system. He wants to focus on acquiring and retaining quality teachers, stopping textbook censorship, and taking the focus away from standardized tests like Texas Assessment of Knowledge and Skills (TAKS). He wants to create a bipartisan committee on public education and give school districts more local control. Finally, he wants to make Texas higher education affordable. He wants to end the tuition deregulation which caused a 23% average increase in tuition at Texas state schools. He also wants to give public universities state funding and help students by making textbooks tax free.

Gay rights
Bell is a lifelong proponent of gay rights. In 2002, the Houston Chapter of the Human Rights Campaign awarded him with their first ever John Walzel Political Equality Award. He cosponsored the Permanent Partners Immigration Act with Houston Congress member Sheila Jackson-Lee. The bill sought to offer residency to immigrant same-sex partners of U.S. citizens, much as citizens of other countries who marry Americans are allowed to stay in the country.

Healthcare
Bell is a passionate supporter of stem cell research. After losing his mother to Parkinson's disease, and nearly losing his wife to cancer, he believes that using science to cure disease is a moral imperative. Bell is on the board of StemPAC, a leading stem cell advocacy group, and often speaks at national stem cell conferences. While a member of the 108th United States Congress, he consistently voted pro stem cell research. Bell is also a strong proponent of the Children's Health Insurance Program (CHIP), a program that has been the target of budget cuts by Governor Rick Perry.

Trans-Texas Corridor

References

External links

 Entry from the Biographical Directory of the United States Congress
 record maintained by the Washington Post
 Chris Bell official campaign website

|-

|-

1959 births
21st-century American politicians
Democratic Party members of the United States House of Representatives from Texas
Houston City Council members
Journalists from Texas
Living people
Moody College of Communication alumni
People from Abilene, Texas
Politicians from Dallas
South Texas College of Law alumni
Texas lawyers
Candidates in the 2020 United States elections
Members of Congress who became lobbyists